Marcel Jean Elie Fitoussi (31 October 1898 – 22 January 1992) was a French sports shooter. He competed in the 50 m rifle event at the 1936 Summer Olympics.

References

1898 births
1992 deaths
French male sport shooters
Olympic shooters of France
Shooters at the 1936 Summer Olympics
Sportspeople from Tunis